Betanzos Municipality is the first municipal section of the Cornelio Saavedra Province in the Potosí Department in Bolivia. Its seat is Betanzos.

Subdivision 
The municipality consists of the following cantons: 
 Betanzos 
 Otuyo
 Poco Poco
 Potobamba
 Siporo
 Tecoya
 Puita
 Villa El Carmen

References 

Municipalities of Potosí Department